School District of Onalaska is the public school district for Onalaska, Wisconsin in La Crosse County, Wisconsin. Onalaska High School is the school district's public high school.

External links
The School District of Onalaska, Onalaska, Wisconsin

School districts in Wisconsin
Education in La Crosse County, Wisconsin